This is a list of all personnel changes for the 2010 NBA off-season and 2010–11 NBA season.

Retirement

Front office movements

Head coach changes
Off-season

In-season

General manager changes
Off-season

Player movement

The following is a list of player movement via free agency and trades.

Trades

Signed from free agency

10-day contracts

Released

Waived

Training camp cuts
All players listed did not make the final roster.

NBA Development League assignments

Each NBA team can assign two first or second year players to its affiliated NBA Development League team. A player can be assigned to the Development League only three times in a season.

() Indicates the number of assignments a player has made.

Going overseas

The following players were on the NBA roster at the end of the previous season and either became a free agent or waived before signed by a team from other leagues.

NBA Draft

The 2010 NBA Draft was held on June 24, 2010 at Madison Square Garden in New York City. 60 players were selected in the draft. All of the 30 first-round picks signed a rookie contract and was named in the 2010–11 season opening day roster. 21 of the 30 second-round picks also signed a rookie contract, but 4 of them were waived before the start of the season and became free agents. 9 other second-round picks were unsigned but their draft rights are still held by the NBA teams.

First round

Second round

Unsigned draft picks

Other draft picks

Undrafted players

The following players were eligible but went undrafted in the 2010 NBA Draft but were signed with the NBA teams and were named in the opening day roster.

References
General

Specific

External links

Transactions
NBA transactions

hr:Transakcije NBA sezone 2009./10.